Acrosticta wytsmani is a species of ulidiidae, or picture-winged fly, in the genus Acrosticta of the family Ulidiidae.

References

Acrosticta
Insects described in 1910